Garotos Podres (Portuguese for Rotten Boys) was a Brazilian punk rock band formed in 1982 in the city of Mauá in the metropolitan region of São Paulo called A.B.C..  

In 1985, while Brazil was still under military dictatorship, they appeared on the Ataque Sonoro compilation along with Ratos de Porão, Cólera, Lobotomia and others of the Brazilian hardcore. They released the first album of the band, Mais Podres do que Nunca ("More Rotten Than Ever"), on the now defunct Rocker label and then the band really started, selling about 50,000 copies and becoming popular until today.  In July 2016, the album was elected by Rolling Stone Brasil as the 3rd best Brazilian punk rock album.

Due to censorship at the time, the song Johnny was censored, while others such as Papai Noel Filho da Puta (Santa Claus Son of a Bitch) and Maldita Policia (Damn Police) were relaunched as Papai-Noel Velho Batuta (Santa Claus Cool Old Man, where "velho batuta" sounds very close to "filho da puta", "son of a bitch" on a free translation) and Maldita Preguiça (Damned Laziness) respectively. 

Mao, vocalist of the band, is also a history professor on the University of São Paulo with a Doctorate in History.

In 2013 the band split, Mao and Cacá Saffiotti founded a new band named "O Satânico Dr. Mao e os Espiões Secretos". The other members continue playing the old songs of "Garotos Podres" by the name "Garotos".

Discography

Albums
Mais Podres do que Nunca (1985)
Pior que Antes (1988)
Canções para Ninar (1993)
Rock de Subúrbio - Live! (1995)
Com a Corda Toda (1997)
Arriba! Arriba! (1997)
Garotos Podres - Live in Rio (2001)
Garotozil de Podrezepam (2003)

Compilations
 Ataque Sonoro (LP, 1985, Ataque Frontal)
 Vozes da Raiva Vol.1 (CD, 1994, Fast'n'loud)
 Um Chute na Oreia! (CD, 1995, Fast'n'loud)
 Urbanoise (CD, 1996, Rotten Records)
 Play it Loud (CD, 1996, Fast'n'loud)
 Arriba! Arriba! (CD, 1997, Fast'n'loud)
 Caught in the Cyclone (CD, 1997, Cyclone Records)
 Punk Rock Makes the World Go Round (CD, 1997, Teenage Rebels Records)
 Cult 22 (CD, 1997, RVC Music)
 Rock da Cidade (CD, 1998, Paradoxx Music)
 Sexta Rock (CD, 1998, Paradoxx Music)
 Oi! Um Grito de União Vol.3 (CD, 2000, Rotten Records)
 Garotos Podres & Albert Fish Split (CD, 2006)

Band members
Including old members
 KK - guitar
 Sukata - bass guitar
 "Capitão Caverna" Nunes - drums
 Mauro - guitar
 Godô - bass guitar
 Maurício - drums
 Português - drums
 Mao - vocals, harmonica

References

External links
 Official Website

Musical groups established in 1982
Brazilian musical groups
Brazilian punk rock groups
Street punk groups
Oi! groups
Musical quartets
1982 establishments in Brazil